In enzymology, a nicotinamide-nucleotide amidase is an enzyme that catalyzes the chemical reaction

beta-nicotinamide D-ribonucleotide + H2O  beta-nicotinate D-ribonucleotide + NH3

Thus, the two substrates of this enzyme are beta-nicotinamide D-ribonucleotide and H2O, whereas its two products are beta-nicotinate D-ribonucleotide and NH3.

This enzyme belongs to the family of hydrolases, those acting on carbon-nitrogen bonds other than peptide bonds, specifically in linear amides.  The systematic name of this enzyme class is nicotinamide-D-ribonucleotide amidohydrolase. Other names in common use include NMN deamidase, nicotinamide mononucleotide deamidase, and nicotinamide mononucleotide amidohydrolase.  This enzyme participates in nicotinate and nicotinamide metabolism.

References 

 

EC 3.5.1
Enzymes of unknown structure